The Bisby River is a tributary of Lac Noir whose waters flow into lake Aylmer; the latter constitutes an extension of the Saint-François River. The course of the Bisby river crosses the territory of the municipalities of Saint-Joseph-de-Coleraine and Disraeli, in the Les Appalaches Regional County Municipality, in the administrative region of Chaudière-Appalaches, on the South Shore of the St. Lawrence River, in Quebec, Canada.

Geography 

The main neighboring watersheds of the Bisby River are:
 north side: Coleraine River;
 east side: Saint-François River;
 south side: Saint-François River;
 west side: lake Aylmer.

Bisby Lake

The route 112 and route 263 coming from the Allard dam road, give access to Bisby lake. Twenty-eight (28) homes have been built near the lake, fifteen of which are permanent residences 

Bisby River

Aylmer Lake receives the waters of the Coleraine River from the north, which connects to Moose Bay. The demarcation between Disraeli (parish) and Disraeli (city) is in the middle of the lake.

The resort is highly developed on the shores of lake Aylmer and the lower part of the Coleraine River. Recreational boating is very popular on these bodies of water.

Toponymy 
The term Bisby turns out to be a family name.

The toponym Rivière Bisby was officially registered on December 5, 1968, at the Commission de toponymie du Québec.

See also 

 List of rivers of Quebec

References 

Les Appalaches Regional County Municipality
Rivers of Chaudière-Appalaches